Ana Carla de Oliveira Barboza (born 25 June 1994), known as Ana Carla, is a Brazilian footballer who plays as a midfielder for Santos FC.

Club career
Born in Vitória, Espírito Santo, Ana Carla played basketball for the most of her youth, joining the team of Osasco/Bradesco in 2011. After nearly becoming a professional at the club, she returned to her native state to pursue a football career, and made her senior debut with local side Castelo in 2013.

In 2015, after spending a period at Boavista (as the club turned down the creation of a women's side due to financial problems) and playing for a local side in Matão, Ana Carla joined Flamengo. During her seven-season spell at the club, she was never a regular starter, and the club announced her departure on 11 January 2022.

On 3 February 2022, Ana Carla was announced at Santos. On 22 November, after being a regular starter, she renewed her contract for a further year.

Honours
Flamengo
Campeonato Carioca de Futebol Feminino: 2019

References

1994 births
Living people
People from Vitória, Espírito Santo
Sportspeople from Espírito Santo
Brazilian footballers
Brazilian women's footballers
Women's association football midfielders
Clube de Regatas do Flamengo (women) players
Santos FC (women) players